City Beneath the Sea is a 1971 adventure science fiction television film and television pilot for a proposed series by Irwin Allen starring Stuart Whitman and Robert Colbert. It began as a conceptual 10-minute demo reel as a means to sell the plot and concept to television studios. The concept was not bought initially, and a few years later Allen produced a two-hour telefilm for NBC. The two-hour movie again failed to gain the response necessary to be picked up as a series. In the UK it was shown theatrically in 1972 as One Hour to Doomsday.

It was released on DVD as part of the Warner Archive Collection.

Storyline
On June 12, 2053, a futuristic oil rig explodes somewhere in the Atlantic Ocean. Retired admiral Michael Matthews is busy in his New York City office administering various engineering projects in different parts of the world. He receives a phone call from the president of the United States. After much debate and against his will, he is reactivated at his old rank as administrator of Pacifica, the underwater city. His escort, commander Woody Patterson, arrives.

They take off via flying submarine for Pacifica. Matthews regrets returning to the city because of a past tragedy that had occurred there, and apologizes because his return means that Patterson will be forcibly demoted without cause. The two officers discuss the ongoing transfer of gold from Fort Knox to Pacifica, a project that began under Matthews' previous administration six months earlier and is now nearing completion. The entirety of the American gold reserve will be secured at Pacifica within 17 days.

Cast
Stuart Whitman as Admiral Michael Matthews
Robert Wagner as Brett Matthews
Rosemary Forsyth as Lia Holmes
Robert Colbert as Commander Woody Patterson
Susana Miranda as Elena
Burr DeBenning as Dr Aguila
Richard Basehart as President
Joseph Cotten as Dr Ziegler
James Darren as Dr Talty
Paul Stewart as Mr Barton
Sugar Ray Robinson as Captain Hunter
Whit Bissell as Professor Holmes

1969 teaser reel
Allen filmed the original concept for City Beneath The Sea as a science fiction vehicle set in the year 2068, but the original concept never aired. It remained unseen by the public until the DVD release of the Sci-Fi Channel's 1995 documentary The Fantasy Worlds of Irwin Allen, in which it was included as a special feature.

Plot
The plot concerns the destruction of an undersea drilling project that could possibly threaten the thriving undersea city of Triton, run by General Kevin Matthews with his associates Lia Holmes, scientific advisor Dr. Raymond Aguila (an amphibian/human hybrid who can breathe underwater) and his head of security Choo Choo Kino. Their lead engineer Temple is scheming to put an end to an underwater drilling project, which is spearheaded by the U.S. government and run by Matthews' team. In the finale, Matthews confronts Temple on the project's surface platform as it is destroyed in flames.

Cast
The proposed cast consisted of Glenn Corbett, Lloyd Bochner, Lawrence Montaigne, Francine York, Cecile Ozorio and James Brolin.

1971 telefilm
The concept was later revisited by Allen and television screenwriter John Meredyth Lucas in the form of a two-hour movie of the week. The story combined a natural disaster story with high-stakes crime drama and futuristic adventure. Many props and models from Allen's previous sci-fi series were included.

Filming took place in August 1970 at 20th Century Fox studios.

The movie failed to be picked up as a series.

See also
 List of American films of 1971

References

External links
1968 Film at IMDb
1971 Telemovie Entry at IMDb
City Beneath the Sea at TCMDB
City Beneath the Sea 1969 presentation reel at Irwin Allen
City Beneath the Sea 1971 telemovie at Irwin Allen

1971 television films
1971 films
Fiction set in 2053
American science fiction films
American television films
Films scored by Richard LaSalle
Films set in 2053
Seafaring films
Television pilots not picked up as a series
Warner Bros. films
Underwater civilizations in fiction
1970s English-language films
1970s American films